Phú Quốc is the largest island in Vietnam. Located in the Gulf of Thailand, the island city of Phú Quốc includes the island proper and 21 smaller islets. Dương Đông ward is located on the west coast, and is also the administrative and largest town on the island. The other ward is An Thới on the southern tip of the island.

Its primary industries are fishing, agriculture, and a fast-growing tourism sector. Phú Quốc has achieved fast economic growth due to its current tourism boom. Many infrastructure projects have been carried out, including several five-star hotels and resorts. Phú Quốc International Airport is the hub connecting Phú Quốc with mainland Vietnam and other international destinations.

From March 2014, Vietnam allowed all foreign tourists to visit Phú Quốc visa-free for a period of up to 30 days. By 2017, the government of Vietnam planned to set up a Special Administrative Region which covered Phú Quốc Island and peripheral islets and upgrade it to a provincial city with special administration.

The historical Phú Quốc Prison was based here; the prison was built by French colonialists to detain captured Viet Cong and North Vietnamese soldiers.

Geography

Phú Quốc Island is mainly composed of sedimentary rocks from the Mesozoic and Cenozoic age, including heterogeneous conglomerate composition, layering thick, quartz pebbles, silica, limestone, rhyolite and felsite. The Mesozoic rocks are classified in Phú Quốc Formation (K pq). The Cenozoic sediments are classified in formations of Long Toàn (middle - upper Pleistocene), Long Mỹ (upper Pleistocene), Hậu Giang (lower - middle Holocene), upper Holocene sediments, and undivided Quaternary (Q).

Administrative units
The city of Phú Quốc is officially divided into nine commune-level sub-divisions, including two urban wards (Dương Đông, An Thới) and seven rural communes (Bãi Thơm, Cửa Cạn, Cửa Dương, Dương Tơ, Gành Dầu, Hàm Ninh, Thổ Châu).

Economy

Phú Quốc is famous for its two traditional products: fish sauce and black pepper. The rich fishing grounds offshore provides the anchovy catch from which the prized sauce is made. As widely agreed among the Vietnamese people, the best fish sauce comes from Phú Quốc. The island name is very coveted and abused in the fish sauce industry that local producers have been fighting for the protection of its appellation of origin. 
Pepper is cultivated everywhere on the island, especially at Gành Dầu and Cửa Dương communes.
The pearl farming activity began more than 20 years ago when Australian and Japanese experts arrived to develop the industry with advanced technology. Some Vietnamese pearl farms were established at that time including Quốc An.

Tourism plays an important role in the economy, with the beaches being the main attraction. Phú Quốc was served by Phú Quốc Airport with air links to Ho Chi Minh City (Saigon) Tan Son Nhat International Airport, Hanoi (Noi Bai International Airport), Rạch Giá (Rạch Giá Airport) and Can Tho (Can Tho International Airport). Phú Quốc Airport was closed and replaced by the new Phú Quốc International Airport from December 2, 2012. Phú Quốc is also linked with Rạch Giá and Hà Tiên by fast ferry hydrofoils.

Air Mekong used to have its headquarters in An Thới.

Many domestic and international projects related to tourism have been carried out, including the latest direct flights from Bangkok to Phú Quốc by Bangkok Airways, which could make Phú Quốc a new tourist hub in Southeast Asia.

With the combination of Vinpearl Phú Quốc Resorts and the opening of the new Vinmec Phú Quốc International Hospital in June 2015, Phú Quốc will add an additional source of revenue to the local economy in terms of medical services, medical tourism, and medical education.

History

The earliest Cambodian references to Phú Quốc (known as Koh Tral) are found in royal documents dated 1615, however no one has offered compelling evidence that Khmers have ever had a substantial presence there, or that a state exercised authority. For many Khmers the case of Koh Tral is one of history imagined rather than remembered.

Around 1680, under the patronage of a Cambodian king, Chinese merchant and explorer Mạc Cửu founded Hà Tiên, including one village on Phú Quốc.

Mạc Cửu later switched allegiance to the Nguyễn lords and recognized the authority of the Vietnamese sovereign. He sent a tribute mission to the Nguyễn court in 1708, and in return received the title of Tong Binh of Hà Tiên and the noble title Marquess Cửu Ngọc

Mạc Cửu died in 1736, his son Mạc Thiên Tứ (Mo Shilin) succeeded. A Cambodian army invaded Hà Tiên in 1739 but was utterly defeated. From then on, Cambodia did not try to resume Hà Tiên, Hà Tiên enjoyed full independence from Cambodia thereafter.

Mạc Thiên Tứ's reign saw the golden age of Hà Tiên. In 1758, Hà Tiên established Outey II as puppet king of Cambodia. After War of the second fall of Ayutthaya, Mạc Thiên Tứ tried to install Prince Chao Chui (Chiêu Thúy in Vietnamese) as the new Siamese king, but was defeated by Taksin. Hà Tiên was completely devastated by Siamese troops in 1771, Mạc Thiên Tứ had flee to Trấn Giang (modern Cần Thơ). In there, he was sheltered by Nguyễn lord. Two years later, Siamese army withdrew from Hà Tiên, and Mạc Thiên Tứ retook his principality.

The French missionary Pigneau de Behaine used the island as a base during the 1760s and 1780s to shelter Nguyễn Ánh, who was hunted by the Tây Sơn army. Descriptions of this mission make reference to the local Vietnamese population of the island but not the Khmer.

The British envoy John Crawfurd en route to Siam from Singapore in 1822 made a stop at Phú Quốc which he transcribed as Phu-kok in March. His entry is as follows:

Western records in 1856 again mentioned the island: "... King Ang Duong (of Cambodia) apprize Mr. de Montigny, French envoy in visit to Bangkok, through the intermediary of Bishop Miche, his intention to yield Phú Quốc to France." Such a proposition aimed to create a military alliance with France to avoid the threat of Vietnam on Cambodia. The proposal did not receive an answer from the French.  An 1856 publication by The Nautical Magazine describes Phú Quốc to still be part of Cambodia even though it was occupied by the Cochinchinese.  The quote from the publication is:

While the war between Vietnam and France was about to begin, Ang Duong sent another letter, dated November 25, 1856, to Napoleon III to warn him on Cambodian claims on the lower Cochinchina region: the Cambodian king listed provinces and islands, including Phú Quốc, as being parts of Vietnam for several years or decades (in the case of Saigon some 200 years). Ang Duong asked the French emperor to not annex any part of these territories because, as he wrote, despite this relatively long Vietnamese rule, they remained Cambodian lands. In 1867, Phú Quốc's Vietnamese authorities pledged allegiance to French troops just conquering Hà Tiên.

In 1939, for administrative purposes, Governor General of French Indochina, Jules Brévié, drew a line demarcating maritime boundary between Cambodia and Cochinchina; and Phú Quốc remained under Cochinchina administration. After the Geneva Accords, in 1954, Cochinchina's sovereignty was handed over to Vietnam.

After mainland China fell under the control of the Chinese Communist Party in 1949, General Huang Chieh moved 33,000+ Republic of China Army soldiers mostly from Hunan Province to Vietnam and they were interned on Phú Quốc. Later, the army moved to Taiwan in June 1953.

In 1967, the Vietnamese and Cambodian government accepted the "Brévié Line" as the maritime border. Later on, Sihanouk renewed his claim on Koh Tral. The Vietnamese also abandoned their previous acceptance of the Brevie Line.

From 1953 to 1975, the island housed South Vietnam's largest prisoner camp (40,000 in 1973), known as Phú Quốc Prison.

On May 1, 1975, a squad of Khmer Rouge soldiers raided and took Phú Quốc, but Vietnam soon recaptured it. This was to be the first of a series of incursions and counter-incursions that would escalate to the Cambodian–Vietnamese War in 1979. Cambodia dropped its claims to Phú Quốc in 1976. But the bone of contention involving the island between the governments of the two countries continued, as both have a historical claim to it and the surrounding waters. A July 1982 agreement between Vietnam and The People's Republic of Kampuchea ostensibly settled the dispute; however, the island is still the object of irredentist sentiments.

In 1999 the Cambodian representative to the Vietnam-Cambodia Joint Border Commission affirmed the state’s acceptance of the Brevie Line and Vietnamese sovereignty over Phú Quốc, a position reported to and accepted by the National Assembly.

Climate
The island's monsoonal sub-equatorial climate is characterized by distinct rainy (April to November) and dry seasons (December to March). As is common in regions with this climate type, there is some rain even in the dry season. The annual rainfall is high, averaging . In the northern mountains up to  has been recorded. April and May are the hottest months, with temperatures reaching .

Protections 
Phú Quốc has both a terrestrial national park and a marine protection.

Phú Quốc National Park was established in 2001 as an upgrade of a former conservation zone.

The sea around Phú Quốc is one of the richest fishing grounds in all of Vietnam, and the aim of the protected area is to secure coral reef zones, seagrass beds, and mangrove forests, all key spawning and nursery grounds for aquatic species, including blue swimming crabs. Among the aquatic animals in the protected area are green turtle, leather back turtles, dolphin and dugong.

Plastic waste is a growing problem in Phú Quốc, and the local community has organized clean-up efforts.

Gallery

See also
Hà Tiên Islands

References

External links
 
 
 Travel Guide Phu Quoc Island
 Island Information & Video of Phu Quoc in Vietnam

Districts of Kiên Giang province
Islands of the Gulf of Thailand
Islands of Vietnam
Landforms of Kiên Giang province
Cities in Vietnam
Fishing communities in Vietnam